Aivar Pohlak (born 19 October 1962 in Tallinn, Republic of Estonia) is an Estonian football official, a former football player (striker), referee, and football coach.
Since March 2007, he has been the President of the Estonian Football Association (EJL)  after being its Vice President for four years.

In 1990, Pohlak founded the FC Flora, Estonia's most successful football club, based in Tallinn. In 1997, he founded the FC Kuressaare, current top-division football club based in Kuressaare. In the same year, he also began to build the Lilleküla's sports stadium. This is currently the Estonia's largest stadium, opened in 2001. He formally handed over FC Flora to his son Pelle Pohlak in 2016, stating that they practice family-club model.

Pohlak received a national award for his work in January 2002. He also was a children's author in former times.

Criticism and scandals
Pohlak is highly criticized in Estonian media for corruption and unethical involvement with the football club FC Flora as the president of Estonian Football Association, especially with the deals the two made with Lilleküla Stadium.

On 30 March 2022 at a Kose municipal council meeting, Pohlak insulted and attacked another board member.

After divorce from her ex-wife Signe, she accused Aivar Pohlak of domestic violence: humiliating and beating her throughout their marriage. The case was dismissed by criminal court for being expired.

Personal
In 2012, Pohlak married Triin Edasi, FC Flora information specialist. They started living together 14 years earlier and they also have a daughter.

From his first marriage with Signe Meisalu, Pohlak has 4 children. The couple divorced in 2005.

References 

Estonian football managers
Estonian footballers
FC Flora
Footballers from Tallinn
Living people
1962 births
FC Kuressaare
Association football forwards
Association football executives